Inape stella is a species of moth of the family Tortricidae. It is found in Ecuador (Napo Province).

The ground colour of the forewings is white, in the proximal half partly tinged brownish. The dots, strigulae and suffusions are brown and there are dark brown spots on the terminal area and tornus. The markings are brownish with dark brown spots and
somewhat paler strigulae. The hindwings are brownish white, whitish basally and pale brownish on the periphery.

Etymology
The species name refers to the shape of the signum and is derived from Latin stella (meaning a star).

References

External links

Moths described in 2009
Fauna of Ecuador
stella
Moths of South America
Taxa named by Józef Razowski